Leo Haber is an American writer based in New York.

Haber was born in Manhattan and studied at City College of New York and is adjunct professor of Hebrew language at Hebrew Union College, New York.

Aside from his novel The Red Heifer (2001), his writing has appeared in various magazines. and he is editor of the Midstream magazine.

References

Jewish American writers
People from the Lower East Side
Living people
Columbia University faculty
City College of New York alumni
Year of birth missing (living people)
21st-century American Jews